"For You I Will" is a song written by Mark Nesler and Tony Martin, and recorded by American country music singer Aaron Tippin. It was released in August 1998 as the lead single from the album, What This Country Needs. The song reached number 6 on the U.S.  Billboard Hot Country Singles & Tracks chart and number 49 on the Billboard Hot 100. It also reached number 27 on the Canadian RPM Country Tracks chart.

Critical reception
Deborah Evans Price, of Billboard magazine reviewed the song favorably, saying that Tippin's vocals "have a warmer, mellower tone - still country, but not quite as twangy." She compares his vocals on this song to "That's as Close as I'll Get to Loving You." She says that Tippin "forgoes his frequent working-man theme for a straight-ahead romantic number complete with lovely lyrical promises set against the backdrop of a steel guitar."

Music video
The music video was directed by Steven R. Monroe and premiered in mid-1998.

Charts

Weekly charts

Year-end charts

References

1998 singles
1998 songs
Aaron Tippin songs
Songs written by Mark Nesler
Songs written by Tony Martin (songwriter)
Lyric Street Records singles